Events in the year 1906 in Portugal.

Incumbents
Monarch: Charles I
Prime Minister: José Luciano de Castro (until 19 March); Ernesto Hintze Ribeiro (from 19 March to 19 May); João Franco (from 19 May)

Events
29 April – Portuguese legislative election, April 1906.
19 August – Portuguese legislative election, August 1906.

Arts and entertainment

Sports
Sporting Clube de Portugal founded

Births

17 August – Marcelo Caetano, politician and scholar (died 1980).

Deaths

References

 
1900s in Portugal
Portugal
Years of the 20th century in Portugal
Portugal